Parectopa rotigera is a moth of the family Gracillariidae. It is known from Chile.

References

Gracillariinae
Endemic fauna of Chile